The GNS Stephen Otu is a Chamsuri-class offshore patrol vessel built by Hyundai, Hanjin, and Korea Tacoma for the Republic of Korea Navy. In 2011, control of the "Stephen Otu", known in the South Korean Navy as the "PKM 237", was transferred to the Ghanaian Navy. The ship was donated to Ghana, just as many Chamsuri-class vessels have been donated or sold for meager amounts to navies around the world, because Chamsuri-class patrol boats are being replaced in the South Korean Navy by newer vessels. The vessel's primary purposes include maritime domain awareness, law enforcement, vessel inspection, naval development, search and rescue, and small boat maintenance. Various illicit activities the vessel is designed to prevent within Ghanaian territorial waters include piracy, illegal, unreported and unregulated fishing, drug trafficking, and oil bunkering. The vessel's namesake is late Major General Stephen Otu, the first Ghanaian Chief of Defence Staff.

External links
(Ghana News Agency)
(Ghana gets fast attack craft)
(Ghana commissions new ship)
(Ghana Navy receives new craft)
(Ghana gets ROK vessel)

Ships of the Ghana Navy
Ships of the Republic of Korea Navy
Ships built in South Korea
Patrol vessels of Ghana